The Jamaica Constabulary Force (JCF) is the national police force of Jamaica.

History

The history of law enforcement in Jamaica began in 1716 when night watchmen were appointed to serve the cities of Port Royal, Kingston, and the parishes of Saint Catherine and Saint Andrew. In 1832 the first attempt to establish a permanent police force began, and William Ramsay was appointed Inspector General of the police force in 1835.

This force continued in service until 1865, the year of the Morant Bay Rebellion. This uprising demonstrated the vulnerability of peace and law on Jamaica and caused the establishment of an improved police force, the Jamaica Constabulary Force. The force began operation with 984 members, under the direction of an Inspector General appointed by the Governor of Jamaica. The force continues to carry out police duties to the present day.

In July 2014, Deputy Commissioner of Police in charge of Operations, Glenmore Hinds, was appointed the Acting Commissioner of Police following the sudden retirement of Police Commissioner Owen Ellington. In September 2014, the Minister of National Security announced the appointment of Deputy Commissioner Carl M. Williams, Ph.D., to become the new Commissioner of Police.

In December 2016, Dr. Carl Williams announced that he will be retiring from the Jamaica Constabulary Force effective January 6, 2017. The Police Services Commission immediately named Deputy Commissioner of Police (DCP) Novelette P. Grant, JP, MA, M.Sc. to act as Commissioner of Police for 90 days effective January 7, 2017. DCP Grant is only female holding one of the four deputy commissioner rank in the Jamaica Constabulary Force.

On April 10, 2017, the Police Services Commission announced the appointment of Deputy Commissioner George F. Quallo as the new commissioner of police effective April 18, 2017.

On January 26, 2018, Mr. George Quallo announced that he will be retiring from the Jamaica Constabulary Force, he was expected to demit office in August 2018. On February 1, 2018, Deputy Commissioner of Police (DCP) Clifford Blake to act as Commissioner of Police until March 19, 2018, when Major General Antony Anderson will officially be appointed to the post. Major General A. Anderson will be the third former JDF head to be appointed as Commissioner of Police.

Role

The force is the arm of the Ministry which is responsible for the maintenance of law and order, the prevention and detection of crime, the investigation of alleged crimes, the protection of life and property and the enforcement of all criminal laws as defined by the Jamaican penal code. The JCF also provides general assistance to the public, as needed. By adherence to their Citizens' Charter, the JCF endeavours to serve its citizens in general service and through the impartial, transparent enforcement of law and order.

Academy
The National Police College of Jamaica , formerly known as the Jamaica Police Academy is the Constabulary's training school located at Twickenham Park in Spanish Town.  Twickenham Park was home to the Jamaica School of Agriculture from 1942 to 1981. The school was defunct in 1981. Simultaneously, there was a push to urbanize the Twickenham Park Area. This urban development gave some land to the JCF. Under the guidance of Commissioner Bill Bowes, police school from Port Royal was relocated to Twickenham Park in 1982. After its relocation, in 1982, the institution was renamed the Jamaica Police Academy (JPA). The lecture theatre of the JPA was unveiled in July 1987 by the Prime Minister of the United Kingdom Margaret Thatcher. The National Police College of Jamaica was established in June 2014.

Areas of the Jamaica Constabulary Force
 Area One: Trelawny, St. James, Westmoreland, Hanover
 Area Two: St. Ann, St. Mary, Portland
 Area Three: Clarendon, Manchester, St. Elizabeth
 Area Four: St. Andrew Central, St. Andrew South, Kingston Western, Kingston Central, Kingston Eastern
 Area Five: St. Andrew North, St. Catherine South, St. Catherine North, St. Thomas

Commissioners of police
The commissioners of police from 1867 to present are as follows.

Ranks
There are 11 ranks in the JCF. They are (in order of highest to lowest):

Commissioner (one laurel wreath and one crown on each shoulder strap)
Deputy Commissioner (one laurel wreath and two stars on each shoulder strap)
Assistant Commissioner (one laurel wreath on each shoulder strap)
Senior Superintendent (one crown and one star on each shoulder strap)
Superintendent (one crown on each shoulder strap)
Deputy Superintendent (three stars on each shoulder strap)
Assistant Superintendent (two stars on each shoulder strap)
Inspector (two metal bars on each shoulder strap)
Sergeant (three chevrons on right sleeve)
Corporal (two chevrons on right sleeve)
Constable (No emblem)
District Constables (No emblem)

Badges

Gazetted ranks

Non-gazetted ranks

Uniform

Constable through sergeant
Blue/black serge trousers with red stripes down each seam, worn with either a white and blue striped short-sleeved shirt. The hat is a black peaked cap with a red band.

Inspector through commissioner
Light khaki jacket, shirt and trousers, with epaulettes on the shoulders. A blue/black cap is worn with a black band and silver braiding on the peak. The hat for Inspectors is a black peaked cap with a red band.

A white, high-collared tunic is sometimes worn by all ranks on ceremonial occasions, with blue/black peaked cap and trousers.

Payscale

A recently graduated police constable's basic pay is J$$852,000 each year or J$71,000 per month. They receive a housing allowance of J$34,500 and get J$21,000 for a set overtime period of 10 hours, which totals J$126,500 before taxes. After taxes, a new constable's net pay (take-home pay) is J$121,000 monthly. The salary in each rank gradually increases with experience.

Excluding the contracted posts of commissioner and deputy commissioner, the top of the officer class is assistant commissioner.

Deputy commissioners earn in the region of J$10.5million. The commissioner's basic salary per year is $13.5million, to which is added approximately $4.3million in benefits for a total compensation package of $17.8million annually or $1.48 million per month.

Training

Members of the Jamaica Constabulary Force are trained at one of two colleges; Twickenham Park, Spanish Town, St.Catherine and Harman Barracks Training Wing in Kingston, adjacent to Up Park Camp. Recruits undergo a minimum of six months' basic training. Students are required to sit for four written examinations called modules, and twelve practical tests. They are exposed to on-the-job training through visits to selected police stations and parish courts. Upon completion of basic training, they are transferred to various divisions (where they are placed under supervision of the divisional training sub-officer) to continue their two-year probationary training. At the end of 18 months' service, probationary officers return to the Jamaica Police Academy for an additional five weeks of training. Thereafter, they return to their divisions to complete the probationary period.

Some elements of the JCF are trained in a para-military fashion, and the element of the force is the Specialized Operations Branch (formerly Mobile Reserve).

Equipment

 Glock 17 & 19

 Taser gun
 Heckler & Koch MP5

 M16 rifle A1, A2 & A4

 Ballistic Helmet

 Baton

 Handcuffs

 Ballistic vest

 Browning Hi-Power
 M4 rifle

 Patrol Vehicles
 Mitsubishi Triton
 Suzuki Vitara
 Toyota Corolla 
 Kia Sportage
 Kia Sorento
 Toyota Hilux
 Toyota RAV4

 Transport
 Toyota Coaster
 Toyota Hiace
 Aircraft
 Bell 407

Controversies

The JCF has been accused of carrying out extrajudicial killings. In 2003 the Crime Management Unit (CMU), headed by the controversial Reneto Adams, was disbanded following allegations that it was "Jamaica's version of Dirty Harry". Mark Shields, then of Scotland Yard and later Deputy Police Commissioner of the JCF, was brought in from London to investigate; Adams was acquitted of shooting four people in an alleged extrajudicial execution.

In a climate of gang warfare cops with a record of killing gangsters such as Keith "Trinity" Gardner (noted for shooting several members of the Stone Crusher gang) and Cornwall "Bigga" Ford ( who was on the scene at the alleged killing of seven 15–20-year-old youths in Braeton in 2001) became folk heroes. The police team was searching for suspects who had killed a teacher in cold blood, and a policeman a few months earlier.

Per capita killings by the JCF are among the highest in the world. With a population of less than three million, police killed 140 people each year in the 1990s—five times the death rate in 1990s South Africa. Current rates may be as many as 300 per year. This makes Jamaica's police force "among the deadliest in the world".

On 31 July 2010, three policemen were arrested after they were filmed beating (and then shooting to death) an unarmed murder suspect, Ian Lloyd, in Buckfield, St. Ann; Lloyd was lying on the ground, writhing and apparently helpless. The footage was shown on TVJ television news 30 July 2010. Initial police reports were at variance with the actions shown in the amateur-video footage later released. The officers involved in the killing were acquitted due to an inability to present the maker of the video for court to authenticate it for evidentiary purposes.

See also
Island Special Constabulary Force
Jamaica Rural Police Force (District Constable)
Jamaica Police Federation
Crime in Jamaica
List of Law Enforcement agencies

References

External links

 
 Island Special Constabulary Force (auxiliary )

Law enforcement in Jamaica
1716 establishments in Jamaica